The Federation of Hong Kong and Kowloon Labour Unions (HKFLU), established in 1984, is the second largest trade union in Hong Kong, after the Hong Kong Federation of Trade Unions, having 82 trade unions and more than 60,000 members in total. The federation was established in 1984.

History
The FLU was established in November 1984 by 15,000 members, 13 trade unions and 4 labour organisations. It remained fairly neutral between the two major trade unions, the pro-Taiwan right-wing Hong Kong and Kowloon Trades Union Council (TUC) and pro-Beijing left-wing Hong Kong Federation of Trade Unions (FTU).

During the transition period of the transfer of the sovereignty of Hong Kong from the United Kingdom to People's Republic of China, the head of the Federation, Lee Kai-ming, was invited by Beijing to the Hong Kong Basic Law Consultative Committee, which was responsible for the drafts of Hong Kong Basic Law, the mini-constitution after 1997. Lee was elected as the member of the Legislative Council in 1995, along with Cheng Yiu-tong of the FTU, representing the Labour constituency. In 1996, Lee was member of the Preparatory Committee for the SAR and the Provisional Legislative Council (PLC), the interim legislature controlled by the Beijing government.

After the handover, the FLU retained one seat in the Labour constituency of the Legislative Council. Li Fung-ying, the then vice-chairman of the Federation was LegCo member until her retirement in 2012.  Poon Siu-ping is the FLU's current representative in the LegCo.

Electoral performance

Legislative Council elections

District Council elections

See also

 United Front Work Department
 United Front (China)

References

Political parties established in 1984
Trade unions in Hong Kong
Trade unions established in 1984
Conservative parties in Hong Kong
1984 establishments in Hong Kong